Abd as-Salam ibn Mohammed ibn Ahmed al-Hasani al-Alami al-Fasi (1834-1895) was a scientist from Fes. He was an expert in the field of astronomy, mathematics and medicine. Al-Alami was the author of several books in these fields and the designer of solar instruments.

References

External links
Clifford Edmund Bosworth, The Encyclopaedia of Islam: Supplement, Volume 12, p. 10  (Retrieved August 2, 2010)

Moroccan scientists
Moroccan writers
Moroccan astronomers
19th-century Moroccan physicians
1834 births
1895 deaths
19th-century Arabs